Northeast 7th Avenue is a light rail station on the Blue, Green and Red Lines in Portland, Oregon. It is the 9th stop eastbound on the Eastside MAX.  

The station is located at the area of Northeast 7th Avenue and Holladay Street. The station primarily serves a large complex of Oregon government buildings and office buildings.  From 2001 to 2012, this station was located within Fareless Square (renamed the Free Rail Zone in 2010), but the free-ride zone was discontinued in September 2012. Bus line 70-12th/NE 33rd Avenue stops nearby on 9th Avenue.

The station also provides a connection with Portland Streetcar's Loop Service (called the Central Loop until 2015), with southbound streetcars (the A Loop) crossing the MAX tracks just west of the platform and serving a stop one block to the north (stop ID 13611).

Due to major building construction adjacent, the station was temporarily closed for more than one year in 2014–2015.  As of mid-March 2014, the closure was scheduled to begin on March 31, 2014, and last about one year.  As of April 23, 2015, the station was scheduled to reopen on May 3, 2015.

References

External links
Station information (with westbound ID number) from TriMet
Station information (with eastbound ID number) from TriMet
MAX Light Rail Stations – TriMet page

1986 establishments in Oregon
Lloyd District, Portland, Oregon
MAX Blue Line
MAX Green Line
MAX Red Line
MAX Light Rail stations
Railway stations in the United States opened in 1986
Railway stations in Portland, Oregon
Northeast Portland, Oregon